Dean Cetrulo (February 24, 1919 – May 9, 2010) was an American fencer. He won a bronze medal in the team sabre event at the 1948 Summer Olympics.

References

External links
 

1919 births
2010 deaths
American male sabre fencers
Fencers at the 1948 Summer Olympics
Olympic bronze medalists for the United States in fencing
People from Bay Head, New Jersey
Sportspeople from Newark, New Jersey
Medalists at the 1948 Summer Olympics
Sportspeople from Ocean County, New Jersey